Demish Gaye (born 20 January 1993) is a Jamaican sprinter specialising in the 400 metres. He represented his country at the 2017 World Championships reaching the final. A year earlier he competed in the 4 × 400 metres relay at the World Indoor Championships finishing fourth.

International competitions

Personal bests

Outdoor
 200 metres – 20.48 (+0.4 m/s, Kingston 2017)
 400 metres – 44.55 (London 2017)

References

External links
 

1993 births
Living people
Jamaican male sprinters
World Athletics Championships athletes for Jamaica
World Athletics Championships medalists
Commonwealth Games medallists in athletics
Commonwealth Games bronze medallists for Jamaica
Athletes (track and field) at the 2018 Commonwealth Games
People from Manchester Parish
Athletes (track and field) at the 2019 Pan American Games
Pan American Games silver medalists for Jamaica
Pan American Games medalists in athletics (track and field)
Medalists at the 2019 Pan American Games
Athletes (track and field) at the 2020 Summer Olympics
Olympic athletes of Jamaica
20th-century Jamaican people
21st-century Jamaican people
Medallists at the 2018 Commonwealth Games